Jameson is a patronymic surname meaning "son of James". It may also be a given name. Jameson may refer to:

Surname

A
Adam Jameson (1860–1907), Scottish physician
Andrew Jameson (disambiguation), multiple people
Andy Jameson (born 1965), English sports commentator
Anna Brownell Jameson (1794–1860), Anglo-Irish artist
Antony Jameson (born 1934), British aeronautical engineer
Arron Jameson (born 1989), English footballer

B
Bert Jameson, English priest
Betty Jameson (1919–2009), American golfer
Bobby Jameson (1945–2015), American singer and songwriter

C
Charles Davis Jameson (1827–1862), American soldier and politician
Clarence Jameson (1872–1928), Canadian politician
Claude Jameson (1886–1943), American soccer player
Claudia Jameson, American writer

D
David Jameson (disambiguation), multiple people
Derek Jameson (1929–2012), British journalist and broadcaster
Dorothea Jameson (1920–1998), American psychologist
Drey Jameson (born 1997), American baseball player

F
Freddie Jameson (born 1929), English trumpeter
Fredric Jameson (born 1934), American social theorist

G
Geoffrey Jameson (1928–2017), Australian wrestler
Geoff Jameson, New Zealand biochemist
George Jameson (RNZAF officer) (1921–1998), New Zealand flying ace of the Second World War
Graeme Jameson (born 1936), Australian engineer

H
Harold Jameson (1918–1940), Irish cricketer
Helen Jameson (born 1963), English swimmer
Henry Jameson (1883–1938), American soccer player
Henry Lyster Jameson (1874–1922), Irish zoologist
House Jameson (1902–1971), American actor

J
Jackie Jameson (1957–2002), Irish footballer
James Jameson (disambiguation), multiple people
Jenna Jameson (born 1974), American entrepreneur
Jerry Jameson (born 1934), American film director
J. Franklin Jameson (1859–1937), American historian
J. J. Jameson, American convicted murderer
Joan Jameson (1892–1953), Irish artist
John Jameson (disambiguation), multiple people
Johnny Jameson (born 1958), Northern Irish footballer
Jools Jameson (born 1968), British game designer and entrepreneur
Joyce Jameson (1932–1987), American actress

K
Kate Wetzel Jameson (1870–1967), American professor
Kyle Jameson (born 1998), English footballer
Kylie Jameson (born 1976), New Zealand sailor

L
Larry Jameson (born 1953), American football player
Leander Starr Jameson (1853–1917), British politician
Louise Jameson (born 1951), English actress

M
Malcolm Jameson (1891–1945), American writer
Marc Jameson, American software developer
Melville Jameson (born 1944), British army officer
Michael Jameson (born 1979), American football player
Michael H. Jameson (1924–2004), American professor
Middleton Jameson (1851–1919), Scottish artist

N
Natalie Jameson, Canadian politician
Nathan Jameson (born 1985), English footballer
Nick Jameson (born 1950), American voice actor
Nicole LaPointe Jameson (born 1994), American businesswoman

P
Patrick Jameson (1912–1996), New Zealand Air Force officer
Paula Jameson, New Zealand physiologist
Pauline Jameson (1920–2007), English actress
Percy Jameson (1917–1981), English footballer
Peter Jameson (born 1993), English footballer
Philip Jameson (born 1941), American musician

R
Rex Jameson (1924–1983), English comedian
Richard Jameson (disambiguation), multiple people
Robert Jameson (disambiguation), multiple people
Rod Jameson (born 1970), Australian rules footballer

S
Sally Y. Jameson, American politician
Sherifa Jameson (born 1996), Surinamese badminton player
Shirley Jameson (1918–1993), American baseball player
Stephanie Jameson (born 1982), Canadian field hockey player
Stephen Jameson (disambiguation), multiple people
Storm Jameson (1891–1986), English journalist and author
Susan Jameson (born 1941), English actress

T
Tameka Jameson (born 1989), Nigerian sprinter
Tami Jameson (born 1968), American handball player
Thomas Jameson (disambiguation), multiple people
Tom Jameson (1892–1965), Irish cricketer
Toni Jameson (born 1968), American handball player

W
W. C. Jameson (born 1942), American singer-songwriter
William Jameson (disambiguation), multiple people
Wilson Jameson (1885–1962), Scottish doctor

Given name
Jameson Adams (1880–1962), British explorer
Jameson Blake (born 1997), Filipino-American actor
Jameson Bostic (born 1984), American boxer
Jameson Chikowero (born 1996), Zimbabwean cricketer
Jameson Clark (1907–1984), Scottish actor
Jameson Clark (singer) (born 1972), American singer
JamesOn Curry (born 1986), American basketball player
Jameson Mbilini Dlamini (1932–2008), Swazi politician
Jameson Fisher (born 1995), American baseball player
Jameson Houston (born 1996), American football player
Jameson Hsu, Taiwanese-American media executive
Jameson Konz (born 1986), American football player
Jameson Lopp, American engineer
Jameson Marvin (born 1941), American conductor
Jameson Mukombwe (born 1991), Zimbabwean footballer
Jameson Parker (born 1947), American actor
Jameson Rodgers (born 1987), American musician
Jameson Strachan (born 1988), Bahamian athlete
Jameson Taillon (born 1991), Canadian-American baseball player
Jameson Thomas (1888–1939), English actor
Jameson Timba, Zimbabwean politician
Jameson Wang (born 2001), American football player
Jameson Williams (born 2001), American football player

Fictional people
J. Jonah Jameson, character in the Marvel Comics universe, father of John Jameson
John Jameson (character), character in the Marvel Comics universe, son of J. Jonah Jameson
Keoni Jameson, Lilo Pelekai's love interest only in Lilo & Stitch: The Series

See also
Jakobsen
Jamison (surname)
Jamieson (disambiguation)
James (given name), James (surname)
O'Séamas
DiGiacomo
Díaz (surname)

Patronymic surnames
English-language surnames 
Scottish surnames
English masculine given names
Scottish masculine given names
Surnames from given names